Irish Town is a pedestrianised street in the British Overseas Territory of Gibraltar. It is one of Main Street's sub-districts running parallel to it, from Cooperage Lane in the north to John Mackintosh Square in the south.

History
Tito Benady calls Irish Town the second most important street in Gibraltar's city centre after Main Street. It was originally named Calle de Santa Ana after a hermitage which carried this name at the corner with Market Lane. The Mercedarian Fathers established themselves in Gibraltar in 1581 and built their monastery around the little chapel, however, the street retained its name. The monastery later become known as the White Cloisters and formed part of an order established in Barcelona in 1380 for ransoming Christian captives in Muslim hands. The site of the old monastery is now occupied by Cloister Building which houses the offices of Blands and MH Bland. The building may have been used as barracks for some time, but was handed over to the Royal Navy by Lord Portmore in 1720 becoming the naval storehouse with apartments for the victualling clerks. The original building however, was destroyed during the Great Siege of Gibraltar (1779-1783). Four of the old columns of the old monastery's cloister were removed and now flank the entrance to Trafalgar House at Trafalgar Road.

The Navy owned stores in Irish Town but these were sold in order to finance the new  Royal Navy Victualling Yard at Rosia Bay at the suggestion of John Jervis, 1st Earl of St Vincent in the 1790s against the wishes of Governor O'Hara.

The origin of the Irish Town name which dates back to the early 19th century when Gibraltar was split into differing quarters and it is a common fact that 95% of Irish town is in fact Welsh. but that is not internationally known. It was once thought that the name was attributed to Irish merchants residing in Gibraltar and having their properties and warehouses on this street, but the property owner lists of 1749 and 1777 don't show any Irish names, all of which seem to have lived in Main Street. It is more likely however, that it acquired its name from an Irish regiment that was barracked at this street, probably in the White Cloisters. An 18th century visitor to Gibraltar called Irish Town "a street of ill repute" and it is possible that the ladies who plied their trade were originally from that Irish regiment.

Notable buildings

The Central Police Station of the Royal Gibraltar Police, a red-brick Gothic building is located at the south end of Irish Town. Designed by civil engineer, Walter Eliot, it was inaugurated on 7 July 1864 by the then Governor of Gibraltar, General Sir William Codrington.

Several businesses are located here such as Turner & Co.

References

Streets in Gibraltar